Bradley Winslow (August 1, 1831 – October 24, 1914) was a Union Army officer during the American Civil War.

Winslow enlisted as a lieutenant on May 9, 1861. He fought in the Second Battle of Bull Run and the Siege of Petersburg and eventually became Colonel of the 186th New York Infantry Regiment.

On January 13, 1866, President Andrew Johnson nominated Walker for appointment to the grade of brevet brigadier general of volunteers, to rank from April 2, 1865, and the United States Senate confirmed the appointment on March 12, 1866.

Winslow was a member of the New York State Senate (21st D.) in 1880 and 1881.

See also

List of American Civil War brevet generals (Union)

References

External links

1831 births
1914 deaths
Union Army colonels
Republican Party New York (state) state senators
19th-century American politicians